Toronto Skillz FC is a Canadian semi-professional soccer club based in the Scarborough district of Toronto, Ontario. The club was founded in 2008 and added its semi-professional club in League1 Ontario in 2016. They left the League1 Ontario top division after 2021. The team plays home games at Birchmount Stadium.

History

Toronto Skillz was founded in 2008 in the south east corner of Toronto, in the former city of Scarborough.

The club joined the semi-professional League1 Ontario in 2016, naming former Trinidad and Tobago player Leslie Fitzpatrick as their coach. He coached the team until 2018, when he moved on to coach at George Brown College.  They played their inaugural match on May 1, 2016, at home against Woodbridge Strikers and despite getting an early lead, lost by a score of 2-1.

Ahead of the 2022 season, it was announced that their League1 Ontario license was acquired Electric City FC of Peterborough. In February 2022, they announced that they would serve as one of Electric City's affiliates, operating a team in the League1 Ontario U21 Reserve Division, under the Skillz name, while wearing the Electric City crest on the sleeve.

Seasons

Notable former players
The following players have either played at the professional or international level, either before or after playing for the League1 Ontario team:

References

League1 Ontario teams
Association football clubs established in 2008
2008 establishments in Ontario
Soccer clubs in Toronto
Scarborough, Toronto